The lateral raphespinal tract is a tract in the spinal cord. It is located in the lateral funiculus and function to modulate pain transmission.

References

Spinal cord tracts